Politics and Language  is a 1979 book by Indian social scientist and researcher Y D Phadke.  It explains and analyses the Samyukta Maharashtra Movement (SMM).  The Movement finally resulted in the creation of separate state of Maharashtra, a state of Marathi speaking people in India.

References 

Books about politics of India
1979 non-fiction books
20th-century Indian books